Christian County is the name of several counties in the United States:

 Christian County, Illinois 
 Christian County, Kentucky 
 Christian County, Missouri